is a Shinto shrine located on Mount Yoshino in Yoshino district, Nara, Japan.  It is dedicated to Emperor Go-Daigo, and the samurai Kusunoki Masashige.

In 2004, it was designated as part of a UNESCO World Heritage Site under the name Sacred Sites and Pilgrimage Routes in the Kii Mountain Range. In 2014 the temple was embroiled in a scandal when  it was discovered that head priest Satō Kazuhiko's private blog contained extreme hate speech towards Chinese and Koreans, in addition to him being the head of a local right-wing extremist group.

References

External links

Official Page (Japanese)

En no Gyōja
Shinto shrines in Nara Prefecture
World Heritage Sites in Japan
Important Cultural Properties of Japan
Emperor Go-Daigo